Findlay may refer to:

Places 
In the United States
Findlay, Georgia, an unincorporated community
Findlay, Illinois, a village
Findlay, Ohio, a city
Findlay Township, Pennsylvania, a civil township

Elsewhere
Findlay, Manitoba, a locality within the Rural Municipality of Sifton, Manitoba, Canada

Other 
Arthur Findlay College, Essex, England
Findlay High School, public high school in Findlay, Ohio
Findlay Freedom, hockey team in Findlay, Ohio, USA
Findlay Market, public market in Cincinnati, Ohio, USA
Russell Findlay (businessman), (1965-), American marketer and first Chief Marketing Officer of Major League Soccer
University of Findlay, Findlay, Ohio, USA
A sept of the Scottish Clan Farquharson
Findlay (surname)
Findlay (musician), English musician

See also
Finlay (disambiguation)
Finley (disambiguation)